Greatheart may refer to:

 A character from The Pilgrim's Progress by John Bunyan
 Greatheart (novel), a 1918 novel by Ethel M. Dell
 Greatheart, a novel set in the Birthright realm of Dungeons & Dragons
 Greatheart (film), a 1921 film directed by George Ridgwell